The Phebe Hobson Fowler Architectural Award was established in 1928 by Charles Evan Fowler in honor of his mother, and was awarded by the American Society of Civil Engineers in 1929 and 1930 for outstanding contributions to architecture. Each of the awards consisted of three prizes.

Recipients 
 1929 
 1930

References 

Architecture awards